Russian is an East Slavic language mainly spoken in Russia. It is the native language of the Russians and belongs to the Indo-European language family. It is one of four living East Slavic languages, and is also a part of the larger Balto-Slavic languages. Besides Russia itself, Russian is an official language in Belarus, Kazakhstan, and Kyrgyzstan, and is used widely as a lingua franca throughout Ukraine, the Caucasus, Central Asia, and to some extent in the Baltic states. It was the de facto language of the former Soviet Union, and continues to be used in public life with varying proficiency in all of the post-Soviet states.

Russian has over 258 million total speakers worldwide. It is the most spoken Slavic language, and the most spoken native language in Europe, as well as the most geographically widespread language of Eurasia. It is the world's seventh-most spoken language by number of native speakers, and the world's eighth-most spoken language by total number of speakers. Russian is one of two official languages aboard the International Space Station, as well as one of the six official languages of the United Nations.

Russian is written using the Russian alphabet of the Cyrillic script; it distinguishes between consonant phonemes with palatal secondary articulation and those without—the so-called "soft" and "hard" sounds. Almost every consonant has a hard or soft counterpart, and the distinction is a prominent feature of the language. Another important aspect is the reduction of unstressed vowels. Stress, which is often unpredictable, is not normally indicated orthographically, though an optional acute accent may be used to mark stress – such as to distinguish between homographic words (e.g.

Classification 
Russian is an East Slavic language of the wider Indo-European family. It is a descendant of Old East Slavic, a language used in Kievan Rus', which was a loose conglomerate of East Slavic tribes from the late 9th to the mid-13th centuries. From the point of view of spoken language, its closest relatives are Ukrainian, Belarusian, and Rusyn, the other three languages in the East Slavic branch. In many places in eastern and southern Ukraine and throughout Belarus, these languages are spoken interchangeably, and in certain areas traditional bilingualism resulted in language mixtures such as Surzhyk in eastern Ukraine and Trasianka in Belarus. An East Slavic Old Novgorod dialect, although it vanished during the 15th or 16th century, is sometimes considered to have played a significant role in the formation of modern Russian. Also, Russian has notable lexical similarities with Bulgarian due to a common Church Slavonic influence on both languages, but because of later interaction in the 19th and 20th centuries, Bulgarian grammar differs markedly from Russian. In the 19th century (in Russia until 1917), the language was often called "Great Russian" to distinguish it from Belarusian, then called "White Russian" and Ukrainian, then called "Little Russian" in the Russian Empire.

The vocabulary (mainly abstract and literary words), principles of word formations, and, to some extent, inflections and literary style of Russian have been also influenced by Church Slavonic, a developed and partly Russified form of the South Slavic Old Church Slavonic language used by the Russian Orthodox Church. However, the East Slavic forms have tended to be used exclusively in the various dialects that are experiencing a rapid decline. In some cases, both the East Slavic and the Church Slavonic forms are in use, with many different meanings. For details, see Russian phonology and History of the Russian language.

Over the course of centuries, the vocabulary and literary style of Russian have also been influenced by Western and Central European languages such as Greek, Latin, Polish, Dutch, German, French, Italian, and English, and to a lesser extent the languages to the south and the east: Uralic, Turkic, Persian, Arabic, and Hebrew.

According to the Defense Language Institute in Monterey, California, Russian is classified as a level III language in terms of learning difficulty for native English speakers, requiring approximately 1,100 hours of immersion instruction to achieve intermediate fluency. It is also regarded by the United States Intelligence Community as a "hard target" language, due to both its difficulty to master for English speakers and its critical role in U.S. world policy.(замо́к"lock")

Standard Russian 

Feudal divisions and conflicts between rival polities created obstacles to the exchange of goods and ideas between the early medieval Rus' principalities before and especially during Mongol rule. This strengthened dialectal differences and for centuries prevented the establishment of any standardized "national" language. The gradual but steady emergence of the Grand Principality of Moscow (1263–1547) – later the Tsardom of Russia from 1547 – as the dominant and ever-expanding polity of the Rus', necessitated the earliest attempts at standardization of the East Slavic language based on the Moscow dialect. Since then the trend of language policy in Russia has been standardization in both the restricted sense of reducing dialectical barriers between ethnic Russians, and the broader sense of expanding the use of Russian alongside or in favour of other languages that exist within the borders of the Russian Empire, and the later Soviet Union and recently, Russian Federation.

The current standard form of Russian is generally regarded as the modern Russian literary language ( – "sovremenny russky literaturny yazyk"). It arose at the beginning of the 18th century with the modernization reforms of the Russian state under the rule of Peter the Great and developed from the Moscow (Middle or Central Russian) dialect substratum under the influence of some of the previous century's Russian chancery language. This occurred in spite of the fact that Saint Petersburg, the Western-oriented capital created by the "Westernizing" Tsar Peter the Great, was the capital of the Russian Empire for over 200 years.

Mikhail Lomonosov compiled the first book of Russian grammar aimed at standardization in 1755. The Russian Academy's first explanatory Russian dictionary appeared in 1783. In the 18th and late 19th centuries, a period known as the "Golden Age" of Russian Literature, the grammar, vocabulary, and pronunciation of the Russian language in a standardized literary form emerged.

Prior to the Bolshevik Revolution, the spoken form of the Russian language was that of the nobility and the urban bourgeoisie. Russian peasants, the great majority of the population, continued to speak in their own dialects. However, the peasants' speech was never systematically studied, as it was generally regarded by philologists as simply a source of folklore and an object of curiosity. This was acknowledged by the noted Russian dialectologist Nikolai Karinsky (1873–1935), who toward the end of his life wrote: “Scholars of Russian dialects mostly studied phonetics and morphology. Some scholars and collectors compiled local dictionaries. We have almost no studies of lexical material or the syntax of Russian dialects.”

After 1917, Marxist linguists had no interest in the multiplicity of peasant dialects and regarded their language as a relic of the rapidly disappearing past that was not worthy of scholarly attention. Nakhimovsky quotes the Soviet academicians A.M Ivanov and L.P Yakubinsky, writing in 1930:

The language of peasants has a motley diversity inherited from feudalism. On its way to becoming proletariat peasantry brings to the factory and the industrial plant their local peasant dialects with their phonetics, grammar, and vocabulary, and the very process of recruiting workers from peasants and the mobility of the worker population generate another process: the liquidation of peasant inheritance by way of leveling the particulars of local dialects. On the ruins of peasant multilingual, in the context of developing heavy industry, a qualitatively new entity can be said to emerge—the general language of the working class... capitalism has the tendency of creating the general urban language of a given society.

By the mid-20th century, such dialects were forced out with the introduction of the compulsory education system that was established by the Soviet government. Despite the formalization of Standard Russian, some nonstandard dialectal features (such as fricative  in Southern Russian dialects) are still observed in colloquial speech.

Geographic distribution 

In 2010, there were 259.8 million speakers of Russian in the world: in Russia – 137.5 million, in the CIS and Baltic countries – 93.7 million, in Eastern Europe – 12.9 million, Western Europe – 7.3 million, Asia – 2.7 million, in the Middle East and North Africa – 1.3 million, Sub-Saharan Africa – 0.1 million, Latin America – 0.2 million, U.S., Canada, Australia, and New Zealand – 4.1 million speakers. Therefore, the Russian language is the seventh-largest in the world by the number of speakers, after English, Mandarin, Hindi-Urdu, Spanish, French, Arabic, and Portuguese.

Russian is one of the six official languages of the United Nations. Education in Russian is still a popular choice for both Russian as a second language (RSL) and native speakers in Russia, and in many former Soviet republics. Russian is still seen as an important language for children to learn in most of the former Soviet republics.

Europe 

In Belarus, Russian is a second state language alongside Belarusian per the Constitution of Belarus. 77% of the population was fluent in Russian in 2006, and 67% used it as the main language with family, friends, or at work.

In Estonia, Russian is spoken by 29.6% of the population according to a 2011 estimate from the World Factbook, and is officially considered a foreign language. School education in the Russian language is a very contentious point in Estonian politics and as of 2022 the parliament has approved to close up all Russian language schools and kindergartens by the school year . The transition to only Estonian language schools/kindergartens will start in the school year . 

In Latvia, Russian is officially considered a foreign language. 55% of the population was fluent in Russian in 2006, and 26% used it as the main language with family, friends, or at work. On February 18, 2012, Latvia held a constitutional referendum on whether to adopt Russian as a second official language. According to the Central Election Commission, 74.8% voted against, 24.9% voted for and the voter turnout was 71.1%. Starting in 2019, instruction in Russian will be gradually discontinued in private colleges and universities in Latvia, and in general instruction in Latvian public high schools.

In Lithuania, Russian has no official or legal status, but the use of the language has some presence in certain areas. A large part of the population, especially the older generations, can speak Russian as a foreign language. However, English has replaced Russian as lingua franca in Lithuania and around 80% of young people speak English as their first foreign language. In contrast to the other two Baltic states, Lithuania has a relatively small Russian-speaking minority (5.0% as of 2008).

In Moldova, Russian is considered to be the language of inter-ethnic communication under a Soviet-era law. 50% of the population was fluent in Russian in 2006, and 19% used it as the main language with family, friends, or at work.

According to the 2010 census in Russia, Russian language skills were indicated by 138 million people (99.4% of the respondents), while according to the 2002 census – 142.6 million people (99.2% of the respondents).

In Ukraine, Russian is a significant minority language. According to estimates from Demoskop Weekly, in 2004 there were 14,400,000 native speakers of Russian in the country, and 29 million active speakers. 65% of the population was fluent in Russian in 2006, and 38% used it as the main language with family, friends, or at work. On September 5, 2017, Ukraine's Parliament passed a new education law which bars primary education to all students in any language but Ukrainian. The law faced criticism from officials in Russia.

In the 20th century, Russian was a mandatory language taught in the schools of the members of the old Warsaw Pact and in other countries that used to be satellites of the USSR. According to the Eurobarometer 2005 survey, fluency in Russian remains fairly high (20–40%) in some countries, in particular those where the people speak a Slavic language and thereby have an edge in learning Russian  (namely, Poland, Czech Republic, Slovakia, and Bulgaria).

Significant Russian-speaking groups also exist in Western Europe. These have been fed by several waves of immigrants since the beginning of the 20th century, each with its own flavor of language. The United Kingdom, Germany, Finland, Spain, Portugal, France, Italy, Belgium, Greece, Norway, and Austria have significant Russian-speaking communities.

Asia 
In Armenia, Russian has no official status, but it is recognized as a minority language under the Framework Convention for the Protection of National Minorities. 30% of the population was fluent in Russian in 2006, and 2% used it as the main language with family, friends, or at work.

In Azerbaijan, Russian has no official status, but is a lingua franca of the country. 26% of the population was fluent in Russian in 2006, and 5% used it as the main language with family, friends, or at work.

In China, Russian has no official status, but it is spoken by the small Russian communities in the northeastern Heilongjiang and the northwestern Xinjiang Uyghur Autonomous Region.

In Georgia, Russian has no official status, but it is recognized as a minority language under the Framework Convention for the Protection of National Minorities. Russian is the language of 9% of the population according to the World Factbook. Ethnologue cites Russian as the country's de facto working language.

In Kazakhstan, Russian is not a state language, but according to article 7 of the Constitution of Kazakhstan its usage enjoys equal status to that of the Kazakh language in state and local administration. The 2009 census reported that 10,309,500 people, or 84.8% of the population aged 15 and above, could read and write well in Russian, and understand the spoken language.

In Kyrgyzstan, Russian is a co-official language per article 5 of the Constitution of Kyrgyzstan. The 2009 census states that 482,200 people speak Russian as a native language, or 8.99% of the population. Additionally, 1,854,700 residents of Kyrgyzstan aged 15 and above fluently speak Russian as a second language, or 49.6% of the population in the age group.

In Tajikistan, Russian is the language of inter-ethnic communication under the Constitution of Tajikistan and is permitted in official documentation. 28% of the population was fluent in Russian in 2006, and 7% used it as the main language with family, friends or at work. The World Factbook notes that Russian is widely used in government and business.

In Turkmenistan, Russian lost its status as the official lingua franca in 1996. Among 12% of the population who grew up in the Soviet era can speak Russian, other generations of citizens that do not have any knowledge of Russian. Primary and secondary education by Russian is almost non-existent. Nevertheless, the Turkmen state press and newspaper Neytralny Turkmenistan regularly publish material version in Russian-language, and there are schools like Joint Turkmen-Russian Secondary School.

In Uzbekistan, Russian is the language of inter-ethnic communication. It has some official roles, being permitted in official documentation and is the lingua franca of the country and the language of the elite. Russian is spoken by 14.2% of the population according to an undated estimate from the World Factbook.

In 2005, Russian was the most widely taught foreign language in Mongolia, and was compulsory in Year 7 onward as a second foreign language in 2006.

Around 1.5 million Israelis spoke Russian as of 2017. The Israeli press and websites regularly publish material in Russian and there are Russian newspapers, television stations, schools, and social media outlets based in the country. There is an Israeli TV channel mainly broadcasting in Russian with Israel Plus. See also Russian language in Israel.

Russian is also spoken as a second language by a small number of people in Afghanistan.

In Vietnam, Russian has been added in the elementary curriculum along with Chinese and Japanese and were named as "first foreign languages" for Vietnamese students to learn, on equal footing with English.

North America 

The Russian language was first introduced in North America when Russian explorers voyaged into Alaska and claimed it for Russia during the 18th century. Although most Russian colonists left after the United States bought the land in 1867, a handful stayed and preserved the Russian language in this region to this day, although only a few elderly speakers of this unique dialect are left. In Nikolaevsk, Alaska, Russian is more spoken than English. Sizable Russian-speaking communities also exist in North America, especially in large urban centers of the US and Canada, such as New York City, Philadelphia, Boston, Los Angeles, Nashville, San Francisco, Seattle, Spokane, Toronto, Calgary, Baltimore, Miami, Chicago, Denver, and Cleveland. In a number of locations they issue their own newspapers, and live in ethnic enclaves (especially the generation of immigrants who started arriving in the early 1960s). Only about 25% of them are ethnic Russians, however. Before the dissolution of the Soviet Union, the overwhelming majority of Russophones in Brighton Beach, Brooklyn in New York City were Russian-speaking Jews. Afterward, the influx from the countries of the former Soviet Union changed the statistics somewhat, with ethnic Russians and Ukrainians immigrating along with some more Russian Jews and Central Asians. According to the United States Census, in 2007 Russian was the primary language spoken in the homes of over 850,000 individuals living in the United States.

In the second half of the 20th century, Russian was the most popular foreign language in Cuba. Besides being taught at universities and schools, there were also educational programs on the radio and TV. An estimated 200,000 people speak the Russian language in Cuba, on the account that more than 23,000 Cubans who took higher studies in the former Soviet Union and later in Russia, and another important group of people who studied at military schools and technologists.

As an international language 

Russian is one of the official languages (or has similar status and interpretation must be provided into Russian) of the following:

 United Nations
 International Atomic Energy Agency
 World Health Organization
 International Civil Aviation Organization
 UNESCO
 World Intellectual Property Organization
 International Telecommunication Union
 World Meteorological Organization
 Food and Agriculture Organization
 International Fund for Agricultural Development
 International Criminal Court
 International Olympic Committee
 Universal Postal Union
 World Bank
 Commonwealth of Independent States
 Organization for Security and Co-operation in Europe
 Shanghai Cooperation Organisation
 Eurasian Economic Community
 Collective Security Treaty Organization
 Antarctic Treaty Secretariat
 International Organization for Standardization
 International Mathematical Olympiad

The Russian language is also one of two official languages aboard the International Space Station – NASA astronauts who serve alongside Russian cosmonauts usually take Russian language courses. This practice goes back to the Apollo–Soyuz mission, which first flew in 1975.

In March 2013, Russian was found to be the second-most used language on websites after English. Russian was the language of 5.9% of all websites, slightly ahead of German and far behind English (54.7%). Russian was used not only on 89.8% of .ru sites, but also on 88.7% of sites with the former Soviet Union domain .su. Websites in former Soviet Union member states also used high levels of Russian: 79.0% in Ukraine, 86.9% in Belarus, 84.0% in Kazakhstan, 79.6% in Uzbekistan, 75.9% in Kyrgyzstan and 81.8% in Tajikistan. However, Russian was the sixth-most used language on the top 1,000 sites, behind English, Chinese, French, German, and Japanese.

Dialects 

Russian is a rather homogeneous language, in dialectal variation, due to the early political centralization under Moscow's rule, compulsory education, mass migration from rural to urban areas in the 20th century, and other factors. The standard language is used in written and spoken form almost everywhere in the country, from Kaliningrad and Saint Petersburg in the West to Vladivostok and Petropavlovsk-Kamchatsky in the East, the enormous distance between notwithstanding.

Despite leveling after 1900, especially in matters of vocabulary and phonetics, a number of dialects still exist in Russia. Some linguists divide the dialects of Russian into two primary regional groupings, "Northern" and "Southern", with Moscow lying on the zone of transition between the two. Others divide the language into three groupings, Northern, Central (or Middle), and Southern, with Moscow lying in the Central region. All dialects are also divided into two main chronological categories: the dialects of primary formation (the territory of the Grand Duchy of Moscow roughly consists of the modern Central and Northwestern Federal districts) and secondary formation (other territories where Russian was brought by migrants from primary formation territories or adopted by the local population). Dialectology within Russia recognizes dozens of smaller-scale variants. The dialects often show distinct and non-standard features of pronunciation and intonation, vocabulary, and grammar. Some of these are relics of ancient usage now completely discarded by the standard language.

The Northern Russian dialects and those spoken along the Volga River typically pronounce unstressed  clearly, a phenomenon called okanye. Another Northern dialectal morphological feature is a post-posed definite article -to, -ta, -te similarly to that existing in Bulgarian and Macedonian.

The morphology features a palatalized final  in 3rd person forms of verbs (this is unpalatalized in the Standard and Northern dialects). Some of these features such as akanye and yakanye, a debuccalized or lenited , a semivowel  and palatalized final  in 3rd person forms of verbs are also present in modern Belarusian and some dialects of Ukrainian (Eastern Polesian), indicating a linguistic continuum.

Among the first to study Russian dialects was Lomonosov in the 18th century. In the 19th, Vladimir Dal compiled the first dictionary that included dialectal vocabulary. Detailed mapping of Russian dialects began at the turn of the 20th century. In modern times, the monumental Dialectological Atlas of the Russian Language ( – Dialektologichesky atlas russkogo yazyka), was published in three folio volumes 1986–1989, after four decades of preparatory work.

Comparison with other Slavic languages 
During the Proto-Slavic (Common Slavic) times all Slavs spoke one mutually intelligible language or group of dialects. There is a high degree of mutual intelligibility between Russian, Belarusian and Ukrainian, and a moderate degree of it in all modern Slavic languages, at least at the conversational level.

Derived languages 

 Balachka, a dialect spoken in Krasnodar region, Don, Kuban, and Terek, brought by relocated Cossacks in 1793 and is based on the southwest Ukrainian dialect. During the Russification of the aforementioned regions in the 1920s to 1950s, it was replaced by the Russian language.
 Esperanto has some words of Russian and Slavic origin and some features of its grammar could be derived from Russian.
 Fenya, a criminal argot of ancient origin, with Russian grammar, but with distinct vocabulary
 Lojban, Russian is one of its six source languages, weighed for the number of Russian speakers in 1985.
 Medny Aleut language, an extinct mixed language that was spoken on Bering Island and is characterized by its Aleut nouns and Russian verbs
 Padonkaffsky jargon, a slang language developed by padonki of Runet
 Quelia, a macaronic language with Russian-derived basic structure and part of the lexicon (mainly nouns and verbs) borrowed from German
 Runglish, a Russian-English pidgin. This word is also used by English speakers to describe the way in which Russians attempt to speak English using Russian morphology and/or syntax.
 Russenorsk, an extinct pidgin language with mostly Russian vocabulary and mostly Norwegian grammar, used for communication between Russians and Norwegian traders in the Pomor trade in Finnmark and the Kola Peninsula
Surzhyk, a range of mixed (macaronic) sociolects of Ukrainian and Russian languages used in certain regions of Ukraine and adjacent lands.
 Trasianka, a heavily russified variety of Belarusian used by a large portion of the rural population in Belarus
 Taimyr Pidgin Russian, spoken by the Nganasan on the Taimyr Peninsula

Alphabet 

Russian is written using a Cyrillic alphabet. The Russian alphabet consists of 33 letters. The following table gives their forms, along with IPA values for each letter's typical sound:

While these older letters have been abandoned at one time or another, they may be used in this and related articles. The yers  and  originally indicated the pronunciation of ultra-short or reduced , .

Transliteration 

Because of many technical restrictions in computing and also because of the unavailability of Cyrillic keyboards abroad, Russian is often transliterated using the Latin alphabet. Once commonly used by the majority of those living outside Russia, transliteration is being used less frequently by Russian-speaking typists in favor of the extension of Unicode character encoding, which fully incorporates the Russian alphabet. Free programs are available offering this Unicode extension, which allow users to type Russian characters, even on Western 'QWERTY' keyboards.

 Computing 
The Russian alphabet has many systems of character encoding. KOI8-R was designed by the Soviet government and was intended to serve as the standard encoding. This encoding was and still is widely used in UNIX-like operating systems. Nevertheless, the spread of MS-DOS and OS/2 (IBM866), traditional Macintosh (ISO/IEC 8859-5) and Microsoft Windows (CP1251) meant the proliferation of many different encodings as de facto standards, with Windows-1251 becoming a de facto standard in Russian Internet and e-mail communication during the period of roughly 1995–2005.

All the obsolete 8-bit encodings are rarely used in the communication protocols and text-exchange data formats, having been mostly replaced with UTF-8. A number of encoding conversion applications were developed. "iconv" is an example that is supported by most versions of Linux, Macintosh and some other operating systems; but converters are rarely needed unless accessing texts created more than a few years ago.

In addition to the modern Russian alphabet, Unicode (and thus UTF-8) encodes the Early Cyrillic alphabet (which is very similar to the Greek alphabet), and all other Slavic and non-Slavic but Cyrillic-based alphabets.

 Orthography 

The current spelling follows the major reform of 1918, and the final codification of 1956. An update proposed in the late 1990s has met a hostile reception, and has not been formally adopted. The punctuation, originally based on Byzantine Greek, was in the 17th and 18th centuries reformulated on the French and German models.

According to the Institute of Russian Language of the Russian Academy of Sciences, an optional acute accent may, and sometimes should, be used to mark stress. For example, it is used to distinguish between otherwise identical words, especially when context does not make it obvious:  (zamók – "lock") –  (zámok – "castle"),  (stóyashchy – "worthwhile") –  (stoyáshchy – "standing"),  (chudnó – "this is odd") –  (chúdno – "this is marvellous"),  (molodéts – "well done!") –  (mólodets – "fine young man"),  (uznáyu – "I shall learn it") –  (uznayú – "I recognize it"),  (otrezát – "to be cutting") –  (otrézat – "to have cut"); to indicate the proper pronunciation of uncommon words, especially personal and family names, like  (aféra, "scandal, affair"),  (gúru, "guru"),  (García),  (Olésha),  (Fermi), and to show which is the stressed word in a sentence, for example  (Tý syel pechenye? – "Was it you who ate the cookie?") –  (Ty syél pechenye? – "Did you eat the cookie?) –  (Ty syel pechénye? "Was it the cookie you ate?"). Stress marks are mandatory in lexical dictionaries and books for children or Russian learners.

 Phonology 

The phonological system of Russian is inherited from Common Slavonic; it underwent considerable modification in the early historical period before being largely settled around the year 1400.

The language possesses five vowels (or six, under the St.Petersburg Phonological School), which are written with different letters depending on whether the preceding consonant is palatalized. The consonants typically come in plain vs. palatalized pairs, which are traditionally called hard and soft. The hard consonants are often velarized, especially before front vowels, as in Irish and Marshallese. The standard language, based on the Moscow dialect, possesses heavy stress and moderate variation in pitch. Stressed vowels are somewhat lengthened, while unstressed vowels tend to be reduced to near-close vowels or an unclear schwa. (See also: vowel reduction in Russian.)

The Russian syllable structure can be quite complex, with both initial and final consonant clusters of up to four consecutive sounds. Using a formula with V standing for the nucleus (vowel) and C for each consonant, the maximal structure can be described as follows:

(C)(C)(C)(C)V(C)(C)(C)(C)

However, Russian has a constraint on syllabification such that syllables cannot span multiple morphemes.

Clusters of four consonants are not very common, especially within a morpheme. Some examples are:  ( vzglyad, 'glance'),  ( gosudarstv, 'of the states'),  ( stroitelstv, 'of the constructions').

 Consonants 

Russian is notable for its distinction based on palatalization of most of its consonants. While  do have true palatalized allophones , only  might be considered a phoneme, though it is marginal and generally not considered distinctive. The phoneme // is generally considered to be always hard; however, loan words such as Цюрих and some other neologisms contain // through the word-building processes (e.g. фрицёнок, шпицята). Palatalization means that the center of the tongue is raised during and after the articulation of the consonant. Belarusian ць, дзь, or Polish ć, dź). The sounds  are dental, that is, pronounced with the tip of the tongue against the teeth rather than against the alveolar ridge.

 Vowels 

Russian has five or six vowels in stressed syllables, and in some analyses , but in most cases these vowels have merged to only two to four vowels when unstressed:  (or ) after hard consonants and  after soft ones. These vowels have several allophones, which are displayed on the diagram to the right.

 Grammar 

Russian has preserved an Indo-European synthetic-inflectional structure, although considerable leveling has occurred.
Russian grammar encompasses:

 a highly fusional morphology a syntax''' that, for the literary language, is the conscious fusion of three elements:
 a polished vernacular foundation;
 a Church Slavonic inheritance;
 a Western European style.

The spoken language has been influenced by the literary one but continues to preserve characteristic forms. The dialects show various non-standard grammatical features, some of which are archaisms or descendants of old forms since discarded by the literary language.

In terms of actual grammar, there are three tenses in Russian past, present, and future and each verb has two aspects (perfective and imperfective). Russian nouns each have a gender either feminine, masculine, or neuter, chiefly indicated by spelling at the end of the word. Words change depending on both their gender and function in the sentence. Russian has six cases: Nominative (for the grammatical subject), Accusative (for direct objects), Dative (for indirect objects), Genitive (to indicate possession or relation), Instrumental (to indicate 'with' or 'by means of'), and Prepositional (used after the locative prepositions в "in", на "on", о "about", при "in the presence of"). Verbs of motion in Russian such as 'go', 'walk', 'run', 'swim', and 'fly' use the imperfective or perfective form to indicate a single or return trip, and also use a multitude of prefixes to add shades of meaning to the verb. Such verbs also take on different forms to distinguish between concrete and abstract motion.

 Vocabulary 

See History of the Russian language for an account of the successive foreign influences on Russian.

The number of listed words or entries in some of the major dictionaries published during the past two centuries, are as follows:

 History and examples 

No single periodization is universally accepted, but the history of the Russian language is sometimes divided into the following periods:
 Old Russian (Old East Slavic) (10th–14th centuries)
 Middle Russian (14th–17th centuries)
 Modern Russian national language (17th century–present)

The history of the Russian language is also divided into Old Russian from the 11th to 17th centuries, followed by Modern Russian.

Judging by the historical records, by approximately 1000 AD the predominant ethnic group over much of modern European Russia, Ukraine, and Belarus was the Eastern branch of the Slavs, speaking a closely related group of dialects. The political unification of this region into Kievan Rus' in about 880, from which modern Russia, Ukraine, and Belarus trace their origins, established Old East Slavic as a literary and commercial language. It was soon followed by the adoption of Christianity in 988 and the introduction of the South Slavic Old Church Slavonic as the liturgical and official language. Borrowings and calques from Byzantine Greek began to enter the Old East Slavic and spoken dialects at this time, which in their turn modified the Old Church Slavonic as well.

Dialectal differentiation accelerated after the breakup of Kievan Rus' in approximately 1100. On the territories of modern Belarus and Ukraine emerged Ruthenian and in modern Russia medieval Russian. They became distinct since the 13th century, i.e. following the division of the land between the Grand Duchy of Lithuania and the Poland in the west and independent Novgorod and Pskov feudal republics plus numerous small duchies (which came to be vassals of the Tatars) in the east.

The official language in Moscow and Novgorod, and later, in the growing Muscovy, was Church Slavonic, which evolved from Old Church Slavonic and remained the literary language for centuries, until the Petrine age, when its usage became limited to biblical and liturgical texts. Russian developed under a strong influence of Church Slavonic until the close of the 17th century; afterward the influence reversed, leading to corruption of liturgical texts.

The political reforms of Peter the Great (Пётр Вели́кий, Pyótr Velíky) were accompanied by a reform of the alphabet, and achieved their goal of secularization and Westernization. Blocks of specialized vocabulary were adopted from the languages of Western Europe. By 1800, a significant portion of the gentry spoke French daily, and German sometimes. Many Russian novels of the 19th century, e.g. Leo Tolstoy's (Лев Толсто́й) War and Peace'', contain entire paragraphs and even pages in French with no translation given, with an assumption that educated readers would not need one.

The modern literary language is usually considered to date from the time of Alexander Pushkin in the first third of the 19th century. Pushkin revolutionized Russian literature by rejecting archaic grammar and vocabulary (so-called  — "high style") in favor of grammar and vocabulary found in the spoken language of the time. Even modern readers of younger age may only experience slight difficulties understanding some words in Pushkin's texts, since relatively few words used by Pushkin have become archaic or changed meaning. In fact, many expressions used by Russian writers of the early 19th century, in particular Pushkin, Mikhail Lermontov, Nikolai Gogol, Aleksander Griboyedov, became proverbs or sayings which can be frequently found even in modern Russian colloquial speech.

The political upheavals of the early 20th century and the wholesale changes of political ideology gave written Russian its modern appearance after the spelling reform of 1918. Political circumstances and Soviet accomplishments in military, scientific, and technological matters (especially cosmonautics), gave Russian a worldwide prestige, especially during the mid-20th century.

During the Soviet period, the policy toward the languages of the various other ethnic groups fluctuated in practice. Though each of the constituent republics had its own official language, the unifying role and superior status was reserved for Russian, although it was declared the official language only in 1990. Following the break-up of the USSR in 1991, several of the newly independent states have encouraged their native languages, which has partly reversed the privileged status of Russian, though its role as the language of post-Soviet national discourse throughout the region has continued.

The Russian language in the world declined after 1991 due to the collapse of the Soviet Union and decrease in the number of Russians in the world and diminution of the total population in Russia (where Russian is an official language), however  has since been reversed.

According to figures published in 2006 in the journal "Demoskop Weekly" research deputy director of Research Center for Sociological Research of the Ministry of Education and Science (Russia) Arefyev A. L., the Russian language is gradually losing its position in the world in general, and in Russia in particular. In 2012, A. L. Arefyev published a new study "Russian language at the turn of the 20th–21st centuries", in which he confirmed his conclusion about the trend of weakening of the Russian language after the Soviet Union's collapse in various regions of the world (findings published in 2013 in the journal "Demoskop Weekly"). In the countries of the former Soviet Union the Russian language was being replaced or used in conjunction with local languages. Currently, the number of speakers of Russian in the world depends on the number of Russians in the world and total population in Russia.

See also 

 List of English words of Russian origin
 List of Russian language topics
 List of countries and territories where Russian is an official language
 Computer Russification

Notes

Further reading

References

Citations

Sources 

 In English

 M.A. O'Brien, New English–Russian and Russian–English Dictionary (New Orthography), New York, The Language Library 1944, Dover Publications.
 
 
 
 Iliev, Iv. The Russian Genitive of Negation and Its Japanese Counterpart. International Journal of Russian Stidies. 1, 2018 (In Print)
 
 
 
 
 

 In Russian

 журнал «Демоскоп Weekly» № 571 – 572 14 – 31 октября 2013. А. Арефьев. Тема номера: сжимающееся русскоязычие. Демографические изменения - не на пользу русскому языку
 Русский язык на рубеже XX-XXI веков — М.: Центр социального прогнозирования и маркетинга, 2012. — 482 стр. Аннотация книги в РУССКИЙ ЯЗЫК НА РУБЕЖЕ XX-XXI ВЕКОВ
 журнал «Демоскоп Weekly» № 329 – 330 14 – 27 апреля 2008. К. Гаврилов. Е. Козиевская. Е. Яценко. Тема номера: русский язык на постсоветских просторах. Где есть потребность в изучении русского языка
 журнал «Демоскоп Weekly» № 251 – 252 19 июня – 20 августа 2006. А. Арефьев. Тема номера: сколько людей говорят и будут говорить по-русски? Будет ли русский в числе мировых языков в будущем?
 Жуковская Л. П. (отв. ред.) Древнерусский литературный язык и его отношение к старославянскому. — М.: «Наука», 1987.
 Иванов В. В. Историческая грамматика русского языка. — М.: «Просвещение», 1990.
 Новиков Л. А. Современный русский язык: для высшей школы. — М.: Лань, 2003.
 Филин Ф. П. О словарном составе языка Великорусского народа. // Вопросы языкознания. — М., 1982, No. 5. — С. 18—28

External links 
 
 Oxford Dictionaries Russian Dictionary
 
 USA Foreign Service Institute Russian basic course
 Национальный корпус русского языка National Corpus of the Russian Language 
 Russian Language Institute Language regulator of the Russian language 

 
East Slavic languages
Soviet culture
Languages of Russia
Lingua francas
Stress-timed languages
Subject–verb–object languages
Languages written in Cyrillic script